Serikawa Dam  is a dam in the Ōita Prefecture, Japan, completed in 1956. In 2009, the Provincial Business Office decided to temporarily stop the dam's production of electricity, due to low water and production levels.

References 

Dams in Ōita Prefecture
Dams completed in 1956